Nicholas of Ely was Lord Chancellor of England, Bishop of Worcester, Bishop of Winchester, and Lord High Treasurer in the 13th century.

Life

Nicholas was Archdeacon of Ely when he was first appointed chancellor by Henry III in 1260, but he was sacked in favour of Walter de Merton in 1261. His politics were in favour of the Montfortian dispensation in parliament created by the Provisions of Oxford.  He supported the new activism for which compromises could be extracted on liberties from the King in exchange for voting money.  But on his return from France, Henry III was absolved by the Pope from upholding the provisions. A bull was published in which the reforms were renounced.  Both the Justiciar, Hugh Despenser, and the Chancellor were dismissed in favour of the faction around the Marcher Lords.  However the offices of state were not abolished, and nor would the overthrow of the provisions mean punishment for the former officials.

Nicholas also held prebends in the diocese of London and was a papal chaplain. Nicholas was a popular reformist figure when he returned to office, although De Montfort insisted that the Council now had the power to appoint, he was appointed Treasurer at the Oxford parliament in April 1263.  Montfort's victory at Windsor and Bristol over the royalists could mean that Nicholas would once more be favoured by his ally, he was granted the office of Chancellor in August, but lost both offices later in the year. He was elected to the see of Worcester about 8 June 1266 and consecrated on 19 September 1266. He was enthroned at Worcester Cathedral on 26 September 1266.

Nicholas was translated to the see of Winchester on 2 March 1268 by Pope Clement IV. He was enthroned at Winchester Cathedral on 27 May 1268.

Nicholas died on 12 February 1280.

Citations

References
 British History Online Archdeacons of Ely accessed on 2 November 2007
 British History Online Bishops of Winchester accessed on 2 November 2007
 British History Online Bishops of Worcester accessed on 2 November 2007
 

Lord chancellors of England
Lord High Treasurers of England
Bishops of Worcester
13th-century English Roman Catholic bishops
Year of birth missing
1280 deaths
Bishops of Winchester